Danvers Township is located in McLean County, Illinois. As of the 2010 census, its population was 1,925 and it contained 757 housing units.

History
Danvers Township was named after Danvers, Massachusetts.

Geography

Demographics

References

External links
 City-data.com
 Illinois State Archives
 Danvers Presbyterian Church

Townships in McLean County, Illinois
Townships in Illinois